Henry Parsons Crowell (1855–1944) was an American businessman, 1901 founder of the Quaker Oats Company and a philanthropist.

Career
As the founder of the Quaker Oats Company, Henry Parsons Crowell helped guide the eating habits of Americans, and in the process helped to create new methods of marketing and merchandising.

Crowell spent much of his life in business and philanthropy. For 40 years he was the chairman of the Board of Trustees of the Moody Bible Institute. The Henry Parsons Crowell and Susan Coleman Crowell Trust carefully states that the purpose of their personal family Trust is to fund the teaching and active extension of the doctrines of evangelical Christianity.

Legacies and contributions
Crowell donated over 70 percent of his wealth to the Crowell Trust. The Moody Bible Institute named the 12-story Crowell Hall building after him. He was regarded as one of the most respected Christian businessmen in the early 20th century in the US.

Bibliography
Musser, Joe (1997). The Cereal Tycoon. Moody Press. .

Day, Richard Ellsworth, "Breakfast Table Autocrat The Life Story of Henry Parsons Crowell". Moody Press, Chicago, 1946.

References

1855 births
1943 deaths
19th-century American people
19th-century evangelicals
20th-century American businesspeople
20th-century evangelicals
American evangelicals
American food company founders
American philanthropists
Quaker Oats Company